Collateral Damage is the debut studio album of Spahn Ranch, released on September 20, 1993 by Cleopatra Records. The album marked the debut of Athan Maroulis, who continued to serve as the band's main vocalist and lyricist for the remainder of their existence. Maroulis began writing for the album three weeks after joining Spahn Ranch and has said that he was primarily listening to drum and bass producer Klute during its recording sessions. Spahn Ranch toured the United States for the first time in promotion of Collateral Damage

Reception
Jon Worley of Aiding & Abetting called Collateral Damage a "strident industrial soundtrack" and said "Spahn Ranch merely cuts through all pretense and serves up 10 tracks of pure vitriol" Keyboard commended the band's resistance to being pigeonholed. Critic Dave Thompson said "Ranch's industrial anguish and fury seethes with barely repressed emotion" and they "create a hard-hitting and provocative indictment of life's injustices, filled with anger, angst, and bleakness."

Option criticized the music for being recorded poorly and for being derivative of Ministry and Skinny Puppy. The critic concluded by noting "this is a band that hasn't found its voice yet; everything is cliché from the music to the unappetizing cadaver shot on the cover, which was obviously purloined from a medical textbook — talk about cheesy."

Track listing

Personnel
Adapted from the Collateral Damage liner notes.

Spahn Ranch
 Matt Green – sampler, keyboards, production, mixing
 Athan Maroulis – lead vocals, mixing
 Rob Morton – programming, sampler, loops, production, mixing

Production and design
 Judson Leach – recording, mixing, editing, mastering and additional programming (4)
 Christopher Payne – cover art, illustrations, design
 Patty Whizenhunt – photography

Release history

References

External links 
 Collateral Damage at iTunes
 

1993 debut albums
Spahn Ranch (band) albums
Cleopatra Records albums
Zoth Ommog Records albums